Chehrakala (in Hindi: चेहराकला) is a block in the Vaishali district, Bihar State. According to the census website all blocks in  Bihar State  nomenclature as C.D. Block (community development blocks).

Major roads
 SH-48

Villages
There are 12 Panchayat and 49 villages in Chehrakala block.

References 

Community development blocks in Vaishali district